Wilfrid Kempe (10 October 1887 – 17 October 1958) was an English cricketer. He was a wicket-keeper who played for Somerset. He was born in Long Ashton and died in Frenchay.

Kempe made a single first-class appearance for the team, during the 1919 season, against Derbyshire. He scored 9 runs in the first innings in which he batted. As the second innings ran to just two balls, he failed to score despite being placed in the opening order.

External links
Wilfrid Kempe at Cricket Archive 

1887 births
1958 deaths
English cricketers
Somerset cricketers